Vidyavati, former Vice-Chancellor, Kakatiya University, Warangal, Telangana, India was born on 15 September 1939, in Goud community. She is President of Phycological Society of India. She was honored by Telangana State Government as Eminent Women on 8 March 2017, on the occasion of "International Women's Day" celebrations.

Early life and education

She studied at Bansilal Balika Vidyalaya, Begum Bazaar, Hyderabad (Government High School) and passed Higher School Secondary Certificate in the year 1955.  In 1957, she studied Intermediate at Koti Women’s College, Hyderabad. In 1959, she passed her graduation (B.Sc.) with Botany main, Zoology and Chemistry from the same college. She did post-graduation in M.Sc Botany with Hydrobiology main in Final level at Osmania University.

She was awarded Ph.D for her thesis on ‘Experimental and Cytological Studies on Certain Desmids’ from Osmania University in the year 1967 under the able guidance of Prof. Jafar Nizam  and Prof. M.R. Saxena. As most of the literature was in German, she passed Junior and Senior Diploma in German Language at Arts College, Osmania University,in the year 1963 - 65 for a period of 3 years. Her area of specialization is Hydrobiology, Phycology, Cytology and Ultrastructure Ecology.

Career

 In 1966, she was appointed temporary lecturer in Osmania University, Hyderabad.
 In 1968, she was appointed permanent lecturer and posted at P.G. Centre of Osmania University at Warangal, which later on, in the year 1974, become Kakatiya University. 
 Further, serving the same university, she became Reader and Professor and Head in the Department of Botany (1990).
 She assumed charge as Vice-Chancellor of the University on 6 May 1998 for a period of three years.

Research

 She did one year Post-Doctoral research as a Commonwealth Academic Staff Fellow at Royal Holloway and Bedford College, University of London, UK., with Prof. John D. Dodge and took training for three months on the processing of Biological Material for Electron Microscopy.
 She did her Post-Doctoral Research with Dr. J. Sulek at the Institute of Microbiology, Trebon, Czechoslovakia.
 She also visited various institutions at Oxford, Cambridge, France, Czechoslovakia, Bratislava and Toronto.
 As Professor of Botany, she visited United Kingdom during 1980 - 81 under Commonwealth Academic Staff Fellowship.
 She also attended British Phycological meeting at Liverpool, United Kingdom.
 She visited Czechoslovakia under Indo-Czech Cultural Exchange Programme during 1984 - 85.
 She visited Canada to participate at the Association of commonwealth Universities General conference of the Executive Heads during August 1998.
 Presented a paper on "Institutional Leadership and Management of Change", South Korea, Seoul and Participated in the International Conference of University Presidents held at Suwon campus of Kyung Hee University during 10–13 October 1999.
 Her research experience is of 36 years.  She contributed more than 350 papers in National and International Journals, guided 25 Ph.Ds  and two M. Phils and published ten books.

Offices held

 President, Phycological Society of India.
 Associate Editor of Seaweed Research and Utilization, an international Journal.
 Chairperson, National Assessment and Accreditation Council, Bangalore.
 National Advisory Committee, Sarojini Naidu Centre for Women Studies, Hyderabad.
 Associate editor, Journal of Aquatic Ecosystem Health, USA.
 Appointed as member of search Committee to suggest a panel of names for appointment to the post of Vice-Chancellor, Dr. YSR Horticultural University, West Godavari District by Government of Andhra Pradesh.

Awards and honours

 She was honoured with Best Women Scientist award in 2000 at Indian Institute of Chemical Technology, Hyderabad, Telangana and was awarded Gold Medal by Plant Science Association, Uttar Pradesh.
 She was felicitated  in A "National Seminar on Current Trends in Biotechnology" organized by the Department of Biotechnology, Lal Bahadur College, Warangal on 30 November and 1 December 2007. 
 She was also Guest of honour in various National and International Seminars.
 

 She was honoured with YSRK Sharma Gold Medal by the Society for Plant Research, Bareilly. 
 On 22 September 2007, she was given Lifetime Achievement Award in Chennai.
 On 2 June 2015, the district administration of Warangal and Kadiyam Srihari felicitated her on the occasion of Telangana Formation Day celebrations.
 She was patron for National Conference on Biodiversity, Biology and Biotechnology of Algae (NCBBBA-2017), 9 - 10, January, 2017 Organized by Centre for Advanced Studies in Botany University of Madras, Guindy Campus, Chennai, Tamil Nadu, India.
 She was felicitated by the Government of Telangana through K. Kavitha, Member of Parliament, Nizamabad  and Padma Devender Reddy, First Deputy Speaker in Telangana Legislative Assembly  on occasion of International Women’s Day on 8 March 2017.

References

External links
https://web.archive.org/web/20140515212127/http://www.kakatiya.ac.in/
http://phykosindia.com

See also
List of people with surname Goud

1939 births
20th-century Indian botanists
Indian phycologists
Indian women editors
Indian editors
20th-century Indian women writers
People from Hanamkonda district
Living people
Scientists from Telangana
Writers from Telangana
Indian women botanists
Academic staff of Osmania University
20th-century Indian women scientists
20th-century Indian journalists
Women writers from Telangana
Osmania University alumni